Howard Cole may refer to:

 G. D. H. Cole (1889–1959), English political theorist, economist, writer and historian
 Howard Cole (speedway rider) (born 1943), Welsh motorcycle speedway rider
 Howard N. Cole (1911–1983), British Army officer  and author of books on military subjects